Biruta Khertseva-Khertsberga-Kemere (born November 16, 1944) is a Soviet retired slalom canoeist who competed in the early 1970s. She finished 19th in the K-1 event at the 1972 Summer Olympics in Munich.

References
Sports-reference.com profile

1944 births
Canoeists at the 1972 Summer Olympics
Living people
Olympic canoeists of the Soviet Union
Soviet female canoeists
Russian female canoeists